Yavrum (translated from Turkish as 'My little one') is a 1970 Turkish drama film directed by Orhan Aksoy and written by Hamdi Değirmencioğlu. The film was co-produced by Nahit Ataman and Ertem Eğilmez. The full original title of the film as it is mentioned in the Turkish film history is Ayşecik Yavrum, 'Karataşlı Emine'''. 

The film is named after the character Emine who desperately and hysterically adopts a black stone in place of her baby Ayşe, when she is unexpectedly told about her death. The black stone embodies the metaphor of motherly-love and sorrow 'fulfilling' the absence of the baby. The drama becomes an exciting study of fate and motherly-love with alternating scenes of loss and hope, of sorrow and joy, as the audience knows from the very beginning that Ayşe is actually alive.

 Cast 
The main character is Ayşe played by Zeynep Değirmencioğlu, whereas Semra Sar plays her mother "Emine" and Metin Serezli her father "Ali". The film attracts attention with a very rich cast of actors and actresses: Suzan Avcı, Önder Somer, Mürüvvet Sim, Handan Adalı, Cevat Kurtuluş, Nubar Terziyan, Osman Alyanak and Münir Özkul   

 Plot 

Emine is pregnant, when her husband Ali joins the army. Since Ali has no relatives in the village, he asks Emine to go back to her father's village, until he returns from the military service. Emine who does not want to be a burden to anyone in the absence of her husband, prefers to stay in the village relying on the job that Midwife Nazife has found for her. In this way, Emine believes that she can more easily endure her husband's absence.

The job that Midwife Nazife has found for Emine is actually a trap. Hosts Handan and Cemal are aimed at stealing Emine's baby by compromising with Midwife Nazife. In this way, Handan wants to take money from her father who is longing for grandchildren, and to make him forgive herself and her husband Cemal who is a losing gambler. After Emine gives birth to her baby named Ayşe'', Ebe Nazife and Handan send Emine to visit her sick husband in the army and kidnap Ayşe. Bad news awaits Emine, when she comes back. Midwife Nazife tells Emine that Ayşe is dead. When Ali cannot hear from Emine for a long time, Ali decides to go home on sick leave and receives the bitter news.

Growing up as the daughter of a wealthy family, years later Ayşe is now a young girl. A surprise awaits Ayşe, when she goes on vacation to her friend's farm.

References

External links 

1970 films
Turkish drama films
1970s Turkish-language films
1970 drama films